Saint-Pierre-Baptiste is a parish municipality in Quebec.

Demographics 

References

Parish municipalities in Quebec
Incorporated places in Centre-du-Québec
Canada geography articles needing translation from French Wikipedia